Biatora vernalis is a species of lichen belonging to the family Ramalinaceae.

It is native to Eurasia and Northern America.

References

vernalis
Lichen species
Lichens described in 1768
Lichens of Asia
Lichens of Europe
Lichens of North America
Taxa named by Carl Linnaeus